2018 Coupe du Congo may refer to:

 2018 Coupe du Congo (DR Congo), 2018 knockout cup football competition of the Democratic Republic of the Congo
 2018 Coupe du Congo (Republic of Congo), 2018 knockout cup football competition of the Republic of the Congo